The Benetton B196 is a Formula One racing car with which the Benetton team competed in the 1996 Formula One World Championship. It was driven by the experienced pairing of Jean Alesi and Gerhard Berger, who both moved from Ferrari to replace departing  and  champion Michael Schumacher and his number two, Johnny Herbert. It was Berger's second stint with Benetton having last driven for them back in 1986.

A direct development of the B195, the new drivers found the B196 difficult to drive, as it had been designed with Schumacher's driving style in mind, but managed to score a series of points and podium finishes. The biggest disappointment was not winning a race for the first time since , although Alesi led in Monaco until he suffered a suspension failure, and Berger led in Germany until his engine failed with three laps remaining.

The team lost second place in the Constructors' Championship to Ferrari at the final race of the season in Japan, at which Alesi crashed out early and Berger also made mistakes.

The B196 was the first Benetton car to race under Italian nationality. It was also test-driven by former Benetton race driver Alessandro Nannini, six years after the helicopter crash which ended his F1 career, and by Vincenzo Sospiri.

Complete Formula One results
(key) (results in bold indicate pole position; results in italics indicate fastest lap)

References

B196
1996 Formula One season cars